The Wide Country Stakes is an American Thoroughbred horse race held annually in March at Laurel Park Racecourse in Laurel, Maryland. The race is open to fillies age three and up over seven furlongs on the dirt. It was run for the 23rd time in 2015.

An ungraded stakes race, it currently offers a purse of $100,000. The race was named in honor of the 1991 Maryland-bred "Horse of the Year, Wide Country. Tom Tanner's home bred, Wide Country compiled a nine-race win streak (all stakes races at either Pimlico Race Course or Laurel Park Racecourse). The streak began in the final months of 1990 when the chestnut filly won the Grade 2 Black-Eyed Susan Stakes over a muddy race track after losing a shoe. She also won the Grade 3 Pimlico Oaks by eight and a half lengths. Wide Country shipped to Belmont Park and Meadowlands during that campaign and placed second in graded stakes company in both cases. Trained by Robert W. Camac, she captured three straight Maryland stakes races on her way to state-bred championship honors. She retired with a record of 20 wins or placings in 26 starts for career earnings of $881,221.

Records 

Speed record: 
 7 furlongs - 1:22.78 - Saarlight   (2008) 
 7.5 furlongs - 1:30.80 - Norstep   (1995)
 1 mile - 1:40.00 - Bare Dancer   (2007)

Most wins by a jockey:
 3 - Mark T. Johnston    (1995, 1996, & 2000)

Most wins by a trainer:
 2 - Kiaran McLaughlin    (2008 & 2009)

Winners of the Wide Country Stakes since 1994

See also 
 Wide Country Stakes top three finishers and starters

References

External links
 Laurel Park website

Laurel Park Racecourse
Horse races in Maryland
Recurring sporting events established in 1994